Parsley Hay railway station served Parsley Hay, a hamlet within Hartington Middle Quarter civil parish, about  south east of Buxton, Derbyshire, on the LNWR line to Ashbourne.  The nearest large settlement is the village of Hartington.

History

It was originally opened in 1833 for goods by the Cromford and High Peak Railway (which ran from Whaley Bridge to Cromford). It opened for passengers in 1856 but closed in 1877. The line was acquired by LNWR and extended to Buxton in 1894 and the station was reopened. In 1899 the LNWR built a junction just south of the station for a line to Ashbourne and built a new station.

In common with the other stations on this line, the platforms and buildings were of timber construction. From this point on to Ashbourne the line was single with passing loops at the stations, though provision was made for doubling which never occurred.

Regular passenger services ceased in 1954 but excursions and special trains continued until October, 1963 while the line southwards closed in October, 1967 with that to Hindlow following in November.

Today these two disused trackbeds form the route of two walking and cycling routes. The High Peak Trail follows the old Cromford and High Peak, and the name Parsley Hay has become synonymous with the cycle centre here.

The track bed from Ashbourne to Parsley Hay was acquired by Derbyshire County Council and the Peak National Park to become the Tissington Trail which was one of the first of such ventures in the country. Later, Ashbourne Tunnel was acquired by Sustrans. Parsley Hay, being located a little to the north of the junction of these walk/cycleways, is ideally located for a cycle hire centre (run by the Park Authority) and a refreshment kiosk serving drinks and snacks all day. There are also toilets here, and a large car park.

The trackbed at this point is also part of the Pennine Bridleway, a  leisure route which includes  through Derbyshire.

Route

See also
 Cromford and High Peak Railway

References

External links
Tissington & High Peak Trails - access and facilities
The Pennine Bridleway
 Parsley Hay Refreshments
Images at geograph
Parsley Hay station on navigable 1946 O. S. map npe Maps
The station on multiple old OS maps, with overlays National Library of Scotland
The station and line, with overlays Rail Map Online

Railway stations in Great Britain opened in 1856
Railway stations in Great Britain closed in 1963
Former London and North Western Railway stations
Disused railway stations in Derbyshire
Peak District